Juan Gutiérrez Moreno (born 23 July 1976), commonly known as Juanito, is a Spanish football manager and former player who played as a central defender.

A player of physical display, he was noted for his excellent aerial ability. He spent the bulk of his career with Betis, appearing in 294 official matches and winning the 2005 Copa del Rey.

With the Spain national team, Juanito appeared in one World Cup and two European Championships, contributing to the conquest of Euro 2008.

Club career

Cádiz and Betis
Juanito was born in Cádiz. After taking his first steps as a senior with the reserves of hometown club Cádiz CF, he transferred to Andalusia neighbours Real Betis in 1997, spending three seasons with the reserves; in 2000–01 he was loaned to another team in the region, Recreativo de Huelva of Segunda División.

Juanito made his debut for Betis' main squad in the 2001–02 campaign, and immediately established himself as a regular starter, often scoring from deadball situations. His first came on 27 January 2002, a last-minute goal against Real Madrid in a 1–1 away draw.

In 2004–05, Juanito netted four goals in 33 games as the side achieved qualification honours to the UEFA Champions League, also winning the Copa del Rey. David Rivas, the other stopper, added another four.

In the following three seasons, as Betis constantly battled La Liga relegation successfully, Juanito only missed a total of 13 league matches, adding six goals. On 22 April 2007, in a 2–2 draw at RCD Espanyol, he played the last minutes as a goalkeeper due to the dismissal of Pedro Contreras, with a penalty being awarded – Raúl Tamudo equalised.

Atlético and Valladolid
After being relegated at the end of 2008–09, Juanito moved to Atlético Madrid on a free transfer, aged almost 33. His debut season was shaky, as he started as first-choice, was relegated to the bench, regained his position from Colombian Luis Perea and lost it again; on 4 April 2010 he scored his first goal as a Colchonero, opening the 3–0 home victory over Deportivo de La Coruña.

For the 2010–11 campaign, all Atlético stoppers remained with the team and Uruguayan Diego Godín was also acquired. Hence, Juanito fell further down in the defensive pecking order, only appearing in a Spanish Cup match against Universidad de Las Palmas CF (1–1 home draw, after a 5–0 away win in the first leg); on 11 January 2011, he terminated his contract with the club, moving to second-tier Real Valladolid shortly after.

International career
Juanito made his debut for Spain on 21 August 2002 against Hungary, in a testimonial for Ferenc Puskás. His first goal for the national side came on 1 March 2006, in a 3–2 friendly win against the Ivory Coast.

Juanito represented Spain at UEFA Euro 2004 and 2008 (playing in the 2–1 victory over Greece in the latter tournament) and the 2006 FIFA World Cup, scoring with his head in the 1–0 defeat of Saudi Arabia. That goal was the first ever scored by a Betis player in the competition.

In the 2010 World Cup qualifier against Estonia on 11 October 2008, Juanito netted through another header in a 3–0 away win. He was overlooked for the finals in South Africa, however, as the national team emerged victorious.

International goals
Scores and results list Spain's goal tally first, score column indicates score after each Juanito goal.

Coaching career
In August 2012, Juanito returned to Betis as assistant coach of their youth team, and two months later he was promoted to the same role at the reserve side. He was given his first job managing in his own right in June 2015, taking the reins at CD San Roque de Lepe for the upcoming Segunda División B campaign; he was sacked in March 2016, as they occupied a relegation place.

Juanito was given a new job in the same division on 9 July 2016, at Atlético Sanluqueño CF in his native province. He was relieved of his duties on 10 November with the team in last place, having not won since the opening day.

After a spell coaching in Betis' youth ranks, Juanito left in January 2019 for the first foreign job of his entire career, at K.S.V. Roeselare of the Belgian First Division B. He was their third Spanish manager of the season, after Jordi Condom and Nano.

Honours
Betis
Copa del Rey: 2004–05

Atlético Madrid
UEFA Europa League: 2009–10
Copa del Rey runner-up: 2009–10

Spain
UEFA European Championship: 2008

References

External links

1976 births
Living people
Spanish footballers
Footballers from Cádiz
Association football defenders
La Liga players
Segunda División players
Segunda División B players
Tercera División players
Cádiz CF B players
Cádiz CF players
Betis Deportivo Balompié footballers
Real Betis players
Recreativo de Huelva players
Atlético Madrid footballers
Real Valladolid players
UEFA Europa League winning players
Spain international footballers
UEFA Euro 2004 players
2006 FIFA World Cup players
UEFA Euro 2008 players
UEFA European Championship-winning players
Outfield association footballers who played in goal
Spanish football managers
Segunda División B managers
Belgian First Division B managers
K.S.V. Roeselare managers
Spanish expatriate football managers
Expatriate football managers in Belgium
Spanish expatriate sportspeople in Belgium
Real Betis non-playing staff